The Root-Badger House is a historic house at 326 Essex Road in Kenilworth, Illinois. The house was built in 1896 for music publisher Frank K. Root. Architect Daniel Burnham, who was the lead architect for the 1893 World's Columbian Exposition, designed the Neoclassical house. Burnham's work on the Columbian Exposition popularized Neoclassical architecture throughout the country, and his later works such as the Root-Badger House continued in this tradition. The house's design includes a two-story rounded portico supported by four Ionic columns, a balcony above the front door, an entablature with a dentillated cornice, and a balustrade encircling the roof.

The house was added to the National Register of Historic Places on May 19, 1992.

References

Houses on the National Register of Historic Places in Cook County, Illinois
Neoclassical architecture in Illinois
Houses completed in 1896
Kenilworth, Illinois